Dulwich Hamlet Football Club is a football club in south London, England, fielding senior men's and women's sides. The women's team are currently members of the London and South East Women's Regional Football League and play at Champion Hill.

History
The men's club was formed in 1893, by Lorraine 'Pa' Wilson. They were founder members of the Dulwich League in 1899, and were its inaugural champions. The club went on to retain the title the following season.

By 2018-2019 the need for the club to field a senior women's side had become apparent. A.F.C. Phoenix, a woman's football team formed less than a mile away in Clapham Common in 2010, had gained significant attention in the local SE London area for a dedicated fanbase, work ethic, and winning promotions in successive seasons.

In summer 2019, the men's club announced a merger with A.F.C. Phoenix, so that the club could field senior men's and women's teams with identical status. The women's team, now known as Dulwich Hamlet F.C. Ladies, play in the London and South East Women's Regional Football League (English Football Tier 5) for 2019–2020, with home matches and training at Champion Hill. Players are semi-professional.

Players

Current squad
As of 19 September 2019

Backroom staff
As of September 2019

Honours
As Dulwich Hamlet:

As A.F.C. Phoenix:
League titles
Champions (2016-2017)
Runners-up (2017-2018, 2018-2019)
League Cup
Winners (2017-2018)
Runners-up (2018-2019)

See also
Dulwich Hamlet F.C. players

References

External links
Official website
Dulwich Hamlet Supporters' Trust

 
Women's football clubs in England
Football clubs in London
Sport in the London Borough of Southwark
1893 establishments in England
Association football clubs established in 1893
Association football clubs established in 2019
Dulwich